Ernest Wayne Craven, Jr. (December 7, 1930 – May 7, 2020) was an American art historian and educator. A scholar of nineteenth-century American art, particularly sculpture, Craven was Henry Francis du Pont Winterthur Professor of Art History Emeritus at the University of Delaware.

Life and career
Born in Illinois to Ernest Sr. and Vera Viola Cline, Craven received a Bachelor of Arts in 1955 and a Master of Arts in 1957 from Indiana University. There, he met his future wife, Lorna Rose Breseke, and the couple married in 1953. Craven then continued on to Columbia University to earn a Doctor of Philosophy in Art History in 1963. His doctoral dissertation was on the Auxerre Cathedral and was titled "The Sculptures of the South Tower Base of the Cathedral of Auxerre: A Rémois Shop in Burgundy," supervised by Robert Branner and Otto Brendel. Louis Grodecki and Willibald Sauerländer also reviewed the text.

In 1960, while a student at Columbia, Craven was named Henry Francis du Pont Winterthur Assistant Professor of Art History at the University of Delaware, and six years later, formally began the art history department there, alongside William Innes Homer. Craven would spend the rest of his career at Delaware, rising to Henry Francis du Pont Winterthur Professor Emeritus, upon retirement.

In 2008, Craven was the recipient of a Doctor of Humane Letters from the University of Delaware.

Craven died at his home in Newark, Delaware, as a result of heart failure stemming from post-COVID-19 complications. He was 89.

See also
List of Columbia University alumni and attendees
List of deaths due to COVID-19
List of Indiana University alumni
List of University of Delaware people

References

External links
University of Delaware obituary

1930 births
2020 deaths
People from Pontiac, Illinois
American art historians
Indiana University alumni
Columbia Graduate School of Arts and Sciences alumni
University of Delaware faculty
Deaths from the COVID-19 pandemic in Delaware